Elvestad is a Norwegian surname. Notable people with the surname include:

Martin Elvestad (born 1989), Norwegian footballer 
Sven Elvestad (1884–1934), Norwegian journalist and author

Norwegian-language surnames